Drugeth Province is a modern historiographical term of a semi-official autonomous administrative division in the northeastern part of the Kingdom of Hungary (today in Slovakia, Hungary and Ukraine).

The formation of the province began in 1315, during the unification war of King Charles I of Hungary against the rebellious oligarchs. His protege Philip Drugeth gained large-scale domains and held the governance of various counties and castles in the region, also granting palatinal rights, which ensured judicial and administrative privileges for him. The existence of the province was based on the honor (or "office fief") system, introduced by Charles I. After Philip's death in 1327, the province was inherited by his nephew William Drugeth. At the peak of his power, William ruled over nine counties and twenty-three castles in Northeast Hungary, and the Drugeth Province was comparable with the three traditional provinces, the Voivodeship of Transylvania, the Banate of Slavonia and the Banate of Macsó in its size, the number of counties and forts and its institutions. Both Charles I and William Drugeth died in 1342. The new monarch Louis I – under the influence of their opponents – decided to abolish the Drugeth Province, confiscating the overwhelming majority of the wealth of the Drugeth family and also depriving them from political power.

Leadership

Central administration

Lords of the province

Judges of the Court of Vizsoly

Treasurers of the province

References

Sources

 
 
 
 
 

Drugeth family
Geography of the Kingdom of Hungary
14th century in Hungary
14th century in Slovakia
14th century in Ukraine
1315 establishments in Europe
1342 disestablishments
States and territories established in 1315
14th-century establishments in Hungary